Fernardo Morales (born 17 January 1986) is a Paraguayan footballer (midfielder) playing currently for Śląsk Wrocław . He is loaned from Zagłębie Lubin. His Paraguayan club was Cerro Porteno.

Career 
  Cerro Porteno
 2006 –  Zagłębie Lubin
 2007 –  Śląsk Wrocław

External links
 Player profile on official Zagłębie Lubin website

1986 births
Morales, Fernardo
Morales, Fernardo
Morales, Fernardo
Morales, Fernardo
Expatriate footballers in Poland
Paraguayan expatriates in Poland
Association football midfielders